Muhinda is an administrative ward in Buhigwe District  of Kigoma Region of Tanzania. In 2016 the Tanzania National Bureau of Statistics report there were 12,667 people in the ward, from 18,211 in 2012.

Villages / neighborhoods 
The ward has 6 villages and 26 hamlets.

 Muhinda 
 Muhinda Kati
 Mubweru
 Ruhuba
 Mubanga 
 Nyakitundu
 Kafunya
 Chengwe
 Nyaruboza 
 Nyaruboza
 Nyakelera
 Kurugoma
 Changwe 
 Chagwe
 Kitanga
 Chunamwa
 Gwanzovu
 Kapuhunya
 Mbweru 
 Hugaumbiye
 Mwilika
 Kagaragara
 Kilila
 Ruhororo 
 Kibila
 Mkalakala
 Buzebazeba
 Bigera
 Nyaruyoka
 Ruhororo
 Kasunu
 Nyabututsi

References

Buhigwe District
Wards of Kigoma Region